Pimelea interioris is a species of flowering plant in the family Thymelaeaceae and is endemic to a restricted part of the south of the Northern Territory of Australia. It is a shrub with hairy, narrowly elliptic leaves and clusters of creamy-white to pale yellow, separate male and female flowers.

Description
The flowers are arranged in small clusters of mostly separate male and female, creamy-white to pale yellow flowers that are densely hairy on the outside. Flowering occurs between July and November.

Taxonomy
Pimelea interioris was first formally described in 1990 by Barbara Lynette Rye in the Flora of Australia from specimens collected by George Chippendale in Palm Valley in 1956. The specific epithet (interioris) means "interior" and refers to the occurrence of the species in central Australia.

Distribution and habitat
This pimelea grows in rocky gullies and in sheltered sites in gorges, and is only known from Palm Valley in the Finke Gorge National Park.

Conservation status
Pimelea interioris is listed as "near threatened" under the Territory Parks and Wildlife Conservation Act.

References

interioris
Malvales of Australia
Flora of the Northern Territory
Plants described in 1990
Taxa named by Barbara Lynette Rye